Jack Park (21 April 1913 – 2 October 1992) was a Scotland international rugby union player. He was born into the famous golfing Park dynasty; and although he competed in amateur golfing tournaments, he became more known for his rugby union exploits.

Rugby Union career

Amateur career

Park played rugby union for Royal HSFP.

Provincial career

He played for Edinburgh District against Glasgow District in the 1933 inter-city match.

International career

Park was capped just the once by Scotland, against Wales in 1934.

Military career

He was a doctor in the Royal Air Force.

Other sports

Golf

He was notable for playing golf in his youth, playing in the Boys Amateur Golf Championship of 1930.

Family

His grandfather was Willie Park Sr., the first winner of the British Open golf championship.

His uncles were the golfers Willie Park Jr. and Jack Park.

His parents were Mungo Park Jr. (1877-1960) and Grace Hamilton Morrison (1880-1956). Both parents were excellent golfers; Mungo winning the Argentine Open and Grace represented Scotland and winning the Argentine Ladies Open three times. They had a son Mungo Park (1903-1959) and a daughter Catherine Morrison Park (1907-1987), before Jack, the youngest, was born. His sister Catherine (Katie) also represented Scotland at golf.

Jack married Charlotte Cicely Bunge in 1943.

He died on 2 October 1992 in East Lothian.

References

1913 births
1992 deaths
Scottish rugby union players
Scotland international rugby union players
Royal HSFP players
Edinburgh District (rugby union) players
Rugby union players from Edinburgh
Scottish expatriate sportspeople in Argentina
Rugby union wings
Royal Air Force personnel
Sportspeople from East Lothian